Tylersville is an unincorporated community in Clinton County, Pennsylvania, United States. Tylersville had a post office until January 9, 2010.

References

Unincorporated communities in Clinton County, Pennsylvania
Unincorporated communities in Pennsylvania